The 2012–13 season is Académica de Coimbra's 11th season in the top flight, the Primeira Liga since returning to first division in the 2002–03 season. As the title holders of the Taça de Portugal, Académica faced Porto in the Supertaça Cândido de Oliveira, losing 1–0. Also, by winning the 2011–12 Taça de Portugal, the club entered directly to the group stage of the 2012–13 UEFA Europa League for the first time.

Review and events
Académica signed Rafik Halliche, Serge N’Gal, Bruno China, Cleyton, Marcos Paulo, Rodrigo Galo, Wilson Eduardo, John Ogu, Carlos Saleiro, Afonso, Salim Cissé and Lassana Camará.

Competitions

Legend

Super Cup

Primeira Liga

League table

Matches

Taça de Portugal

Taça da Liga

Round 2

Group D

UEFA Europa League

Group stage

Current squad
As of December 30, 2012.

References

Academica
Academica
Associação Académica de Coimbra – O.A.F. seasons